Makhzumi may refer to:
Makhzumi dynasty
Hisham ibn Isma'il al-Makhzumi
Abu Salama 'Abd Allah ibn 'Abd al-Asad al-Makhzumi